James or Jim Piper may refer to:

Jim Piper (born 1981), Australian breastroke swimmer
Sir James Piper, character in Sunset at Blandings
James A. Piper (1949?–), New Zealand/Australian physicist
Jim Piper (footballer) (1884–1949), Australian rules footballer